Peach Creek is a stream in the U.S. state of West Virginia.

Peach Creek was named for a peach orchard located along its course.

See also
List of rivers of West Virginia

References

Rivers of Logan County, West Virginia
Rivers of West Virginia